The 2009 UCI Cyclo-cross World Championships took place in Hoogerheide, Netherlands on the weekend of January 31 and February 1, 2009. As in 2008, four events were scheduled.

Medal table

Medal summary

External links

UCI website

 
Uci Cyclo-cross World Championships, 2009
Cyclo-cross
UCI Cyclo-cross World Championships
International cycle races hosted by the Netherlands
January 2009 sports events in Europe
February 2009 sports events in Europe